Everclear is a brand of grain alcohol.

Everclear may also refer to:

Everclear (band), an American rock band 
Everclear (album), by American Music Club, 1991
Ulmus parvifolia 'BSNUPF', an elm cultivar sold under the marketing name Everclear